Abdul Rahman Yahya Al-Eryani (10 June 1910 – 14 March 1998) was the President of the Yemen Arab Republic (North Yemen) from 5 November 1967 to 13 June 1974. Originally a leader of the Free Yemeni Movement (Al-Ahrar) opposition group during the time of the Mutawakkilite Kingdom of Yemen, al-Eryani served as Minister of Religious Endowments under North Yemen's first republican government and later became the only civilian politician to have led Northern Yemen. He was eventually overthrown by Ibrahim al-Hamdi and died in exile.

Early life
Abd al-Rahman al-Iryani was born in the village of Iryan in 1910. His father, Yahia al-Iryani, was the Chief Judge of the Mutawakkilite Kingdom of Yemen and a highly regarded Sharia scholar. His mother, Salwa al-Iryani was well known for her charitable efforts in her village.

Abd al-Rahman started his education in his village Iryan until the age of 16 when he left for the capital Sanaa to study at its famous Sharia School. After a few years, he graduated and worked at the Imam Court until 1937 when he was appointed as a judge for the first time.

According to Yossi Melman of Haaretz, Dorit Mizrahi of the Mishpacha Magazine, and an article in the weekly HaOlam HaZeh, there are allegations that al-Iryani was born Zekharia Hadad to a Yemenite Jewish family in Ibb.  According to this version, in 1918, there was a drought in Yemen, which had a severe effect on the Jews, who were generally worse off than the Arabs.  Both his parents died, and he was then adopted by the al-Iryani, a powerful Muslim family, and was renamed "Abd al-Rahman al-Iryani"  and converted to Islam. At that time, Yemen was ruled by Yahya Muhammad Hamid ed-Din, who decreed that all orphaned Jewish children must be disconnected from their religion and be given over for adoption to a Muslim family.

According to YemenOnline, the claim of Jewish descent is a "fantasy". According to this version, Abdul Rahman was not the adopted Zekharia, but his stepbrother.  Further, Abdul Raheem, who was close to his stepbrother, Abdul Rahman, was the real Zekharia Hadad.  Abdul Raheem is said to have retired in Iryan before dying in 1980, and has dozens of surviving children and grandchildren.

Participation in the Constitution Revolution
Al-Eryani actively opposed the kings of the Mutawakkalite Kingdom of Yemen, helping to lead al-Ahrar ("the free") group in pushing for a republic.  In February 1948, he participated in the "Constitution Revolution" of the Free Yemeni Movement against the King (Imam) aiming at the establishment of a constitutional monarchy.  He was imprisoned for about 7 years after the failure of the revolution, which lasted for only a few weeks.  Al-Eryani was sentenced to death by beheading in 1955 for his activities with Al-Ahrar.  However, minutes before his execution by sword, he was granted a reprieve by King Imam Ahmed. He spent more than 15 years in jail until his release in 1962.

Term as President of Yemen
Abdul Rahman Al-Eryani opposed Egyptian and Saudi interference in Yemen affairs and, with two of his colleagues, Ahmad Muhammad Numan and Mohamad Al-Zubairi, he led a strong movement against the foreign involvement of Nasser's Egypt in the Yemeni civil war between republicans and royalists.  He was held in Egypt with Noaman in 1966 while their partner Al-Zubairi was assassinated earlier.

In 1970, he arrived at a national conciliation agreement with the supporters of the royal regime and established a formal relation with Saudi Arabia. In 1972, he reached an agreement with South Yemen for the unification of the two parts of the country, which constituted the basic foundations for the unification of 1990. It was also during his regime that Yemen had parliamentary elections and permanent constitution for the first time.

Following Ibrahim al-Hamdi's coup in 1974, al-Eryani went into exile in Syria. He eventually died in Damascus in 1998.

References

1910 births
1998 deaths
Yemeni Muslims
Presidents of North Yemen
Prime Ministers of North Yemen
People from Ibb Governorate
Leaders ousted by a coup
Leaders who took power by coup